The Cavanaugh Flight Museum is an aviation museum in Addison, Texas, with a non-profit 501(c)(3) status for aviation educational.

Mission 
The Museum promotes aviation education, research and American aviation heritage.  Further, the Museum provides aircraft restoration, operates and maintains flying aircraft, maintains and displays historically-significant vintage aircraft; with an aviation collections department.

History
The aircraft collection held by the museum began as the personal collection of businessman Jim Cavanaugh. His collection began with the purchase of a half-share in a 1939 Piper J-3 Cub in 1980. The museum opened in October 1993.

Exhibits and collections
The flight museum is home to an aviation art gallery that includes pieces from Keith Ferris, Roy Grinnell, William Phillips, John Shaw, Stan Stokes, Robert Taylor, and Nicholas Trudgian.

B-29 "FiFi" Project
In a joint press release, dated 21 January 2008, the Commemorative Air Force and the Cavanaugh Flight Museum, announced a pledge of $1.2M USD to re-engine FiFi, a B-29 Superfortress. The pledge was made by Jim Cavanaugh, the founder of the Cavanaugh Flight Museum. As a result of the contribution, FiFi was returned to flight status, and the B-29/B-24 Squadron of the CAF was relocated from Midland, Texas to the Addison Airport, at Addison, Texas (KADS).  The B24 and the B-29 were, for the six months of each year they were not on tour, kept and maintained at Addison. FiFi was sent to Meacham Field in Fort Worth during the winters.

FIFI was based at the Cavanaugh Flight Museum until 2013, when it was relocated to the Vintage Flying Museum at the Meacham International Airport in Fort Worth, Texas. 

In 2021 FIFI was moved to the Henry B. Tippie National Aviation Education Center (NAEC) at Dallas Executive Airport (KRBD) in Dallas, Texas.

Partial List of Collection

World War I
 Fokker D.VII
 Fokker Dr.I  
 Halberstadt CL.II
 Pfalz D.III
 Sopwith Camel

World War II

Korean War

Vietnam War

Civilian aircraft
 Christen Eagle II
 Piper J-3 Cub
 Pitts Special
 Travel Air 4000

See also
List of aerospace museums

References

External links 

 Museum website

Aerospace museums in Texas
Museums in Dallas County, Texas
Museums established in 1993
Military and war museums in Texas
Addison, Texas